Red-eyed tree frog is a common name for several frog species:
 Agalychnis callidryas, native to Central America and Colombia
 Agalychnis taylori, native to Mexico and Central America
 Ranoidea chloris, native to Australia